"Shake Your Head" is a song by American pop rock group Was (Not Was). It was originally released in 1983 on the album Born to Laugh at Tornadoes. In 1992, it was re-recorded and remixed by house music producer Steve "Silk" Hurley, and features actress Kim Basinger alongside a re-recorded Ozzy Osbourne on vocals. It appears on the group's compilation album, Hello Dad... I'm in Jail.

Background

The original version features Black Sabbath singer Ozzy Osbourne on lead vocals. A pre-fame Madonna had auditioned for the vocal but was not used on the final release. In 1992, it was re-recorded and remixed by house music producer Steve "Silk" Hurley, and features actress Kim Basinger alongside a re-recorded Ozzy Osbourne on vocals. It appeared on the group's compilation album Hello Dad... I'm in Jail. The original plan was to restore Madonna's vocals to the track for the re-release, but she refused to grant permission, hence Basinger was approached instead. However, Madonna's restored vocals were accidentally released on two occasions. A full Madonna vocal appears on the two-LP and double-cassette formats of compilation release Now Dance 92, entitled the 12-inch mix. The CD format of this compilation includes the regular 7-inch mix, however. Secondly, on the 12-inch and CD single formats of Was (Not Was)'s follow-up single, "Somewhere in America (There's a Street Named after My Dad)", there is a Dub Mix of "Shake Your Head" which uses several of Madonna's vocals. Although the song did not chart in the US, it was the band's biggest commercial success across the Atlantic, reaching number four on the UK Singles Chart.

There are several versions of the 1992 remake: 
 The 3:48 single version starts with Osbourne singing "You can't feed the hungry, you can't talk Shakespeare to a monkey..."
 The 4:00 album version starts with female vocals (presumably Basinger) singing "You can't argue with death. You can't break a burly sailor's neck. You can't drink lava from plastic glasses...". There is also a Steve "Silk" Hurley 12-inch mix and a 12-inch dub.

The song's lyrics deal with things that cannot be done (some are outlandish, some can be done, but have a high amount of difficulty). After Basinger and Osbourne detail these things, the chorus comes in with the title hook.

Track listings
7-inch and cassette single
 "Shake Your Head" – 3:42
 "I Blew Up the United States" – 3:51

12-inch single
A1. "Shake Your Head" – 6:49
A2. "I Blew Up the United States" – 3:51
B1. "Listen Like Thieves" (Giant club mix)
B2. "Listen Like Thieves" (Vandal dub)

CD single
 "Shake Your Head"
 "Spy in the House of Love"
 "I Blew Up the United States"
 "Robot Girl"

Charts

Weekly charts

Year-end chart

Other versions

In 2003, C. C. Catch released a version of the song which reached reached 12th on the Spanish charts and developed into a summer hit in southern Europe.

References

Was (Not Was) songs
1983 songs
1992 singles
Fontana Records singles
Geffen Records singles
Song recordings produced by Don Was
Songs written by David Was
Songs written by Don Was